Fenyramidol (INN) or phenyramidol (BAN, USAN), trade name Cabral, is a pharmaceutical drug which acts as a muscle relaxant.

Drug Interactions 
Fenyramidol inhibits the metabolism of phenytoin, leading to possible increases in plasma phenytonin levels.

References 

Aminopyridines
Drugs with unknown mechanisms of action
Phenylethanolamines